Juan Manuel Vivaldi (born 17 July 1979) is an Argentine field hockey goalkeeper who plays club hockey in his native country for Banco Provincia. He was a member of the men's national team from 2001 to 2021 and was the stand-in for first choice goalie Pablo Moreira at the 2004 Summer Olympics in Athens, where the South Americans finished in 11th position. Vivaldi was also on the side that ended up fifth at the 2003 Champions Trophy in Amstelveen and won the 2005 Champions Challenge tournament in Alexandria, Egypt. He was part of the Argentine team that finished in 10th position at the 2012 Summer Olympics.

He played for the Argentine team that won the bronze medal at the 2014 Men's Hockey World Cup, beating England in the bronze medal playoff. Juan Manuel has also won three medals at the Pan American Games and two Champions Challenge. In July 2019, he was selected in the Argentina squad for the 2019 Pan American Games. They won the gold medal by defeating Canada 5-2 in the final.

References

External links

1979 births
Living people
Field hockey players from Buenos Aires
Argentine male field hockey players
Male field hockey goalkeepers
Argentine people of Italian descent
Olympic field hockey players of Argentina
Field hockey players at the 2004 Summer Olympics
2006 Men's Hockey World Cup players
Field hockey players at the 2007 Pan American Games
Field hockey players at the 2011 Pan American Games
Field hockey players at the 2012 Summer Olympics
2014 Men's Hockey World Cup players
Field hockey players at the 2015 Pan American Games
Field hockey players at the 2016 Summer Olympics
2018 Men's Hockey World Cup players
Field hockey players at the 2019 Pan American Games
Pan American Games gold medalists for Argentina
Pan American Games silver medalists for Argentina
Olympic medalists in field hockey
Medalists at the 2016 Summer Olympics
Olympic gold medalists for Argentina
Pan American Games medalists in field hockey
South American Games medalists in field hockey
South American Games gold medalists for Argentina
Competitors at the 2014 South American Games
Medalists at the 2007 Pan American Games
Medalists at the 2011 Pan American Games
Medalists at the 2015 Pan American Games
Medalists at the 2019 Pan American Games
Field hockey players at the 2020 Summer Olympics